Noel Roeim Fisher (born March 13, 1984) is a Canadian actor. He is known for his portrayal of Mickey Milkovich on the Showtime series Shameless, as well as his portrayal of Cael Malloy on the FX series The Riches. He played Ellison "Cotton Top" Mounts in the Emmy Award-winning miniseries Hatfields & McCoys as well as Vladimir, a 1,500-year-old vampire in The Twilight Saga: Breaking Dawn – Part 2, and Michelangelo in Teenage Mutant Ninja Turtles and its sequel Teenage Mutant Ninja Turtles: Out of the Shadows and X-Men: Evolution where he voiced the character Todd “Toad” Tolansky. He also has had roles in shows such as Criminal Minds: Suspect Behavior, Lie to Me, Bones, and Law & Order: Special Victims Unit.

Early life
Fisher was born in Vancouver, British Columbia. He began his acting career at the age of 14 in the television film The Sheldon Kennedy Story. During his time as a young actor in Vancouver, he was encouraged to "take many different classes" and "fell in love" with piano, which he studied for eight years.

Career
Fisher began his acting career at age 14. He debuted in 1999 with The Sheldon Kennedy Story, a sports drama film about ice hockey player Sheldon Kennedy. He also starred as Freddie in Season 1 of Two and a Half Men in 2004. His performance landed Fisher his first Gemini Awards nomination. He gained a second nomination with the TV series Godiva's in 2005. He played Brian Gibbons in Final Destination 2 in 2003, one of his first roles in an American film. From 2007, Fisher became more known by the public due to the FX series The Riches, portraying Cael, the conniving and clever son of parents played by Eddie Izzard and Minnie Driver. 

Fisher has received critical acclaim for playing Mickey Milkovich, a gay thug character on Shameless from 2011 to 2021. In 2014 Vanity Fair named his relationship with Cameron Monaghan's Ian Gallagher the best-written gay couple on television. Though Fisher is straight, his sexuality is often questioned in interviews. He has responded to the controversy:

In 2017 Fisher starred in the National Geographic docu-series The Long Road Home. He played Pfc. Tomas Young, the Iraq war veteran who famously became a war protester after being paralyzed during an ambush only days after being sent to fight overseas. Fisher told creator Mikko Allanne he would not accept the part unless he could meet with Young's family; "That's how committed he was to doing it right".

Fisher played Ellison "Cotton Top" Mounts in the award-winning miniseries Hatfields & McCoys (miniseries) as well as Vladimir, a 1.500-year old vampire in The Twilight Saga: Breaking Dawn – Part 2 and Michelangelo in Teenage Mutant Ninja Turtles and its sequel Teenage Mutant Ninja Turtles: Out of the Shadows. In May 2020, he starred opposite Tom Hardy in the Al Capone biopic Capone as Junior, Capone's son. He starred in the limited CBS series The Red Line and had a recurring role in the Hulu series Castle Rock. He also had roles in: Bones, Law & Order: Special Victims Unit, Fear the Walking Dead, and The Conners.

Personal life
Since November 2004, Fisher has been in a relationship with actress Layla Alizada. The couple were engaged in 2014, and on July 15, 2017, were married.

Filmography

Film

Television

References

External links
 

1984 births
Living people
20th-century Canadian male actors
21st-century Canadian male actors
Male actors from Vancouver
Canadian male child actors
Canadian male film actors
Canadian male television actors
Canadian male voice actors